Tom Benson (1927–2018) was the owner of the New Orleans Saints and New Orleans Pelicans.

Thomas or Tom Benson may also refer to:

 Thomas Benson (American football) (born 1961), former American football linebacker
Tom Benson (politician) (1929–2000), Unionist politician in Northern Ireland
Thomas Benson (1708–1772), British ship-owner, merchant and politician
Thomas Benson (priest) (1654–1715), Anglican priest in Ireland
T. D. Benson (Thomas Duckworth Benson, 1857–1926), British socialist politician
Tom Benson, a character in 7th Cavalry

See also
William Thomas Benson (1824–1885), Canadian politician